Aboudé is a town in southern Ivory Coast. It is a sub-prefecture of Agboville Department in Agnéby-Tiassa Region, Lagunes District.

Aboudé was a commune until March 2012, when it became one of 1126 communes nationwide that were abolished.

In 2021, the population of the sub-prefecture of Aboudé was 28,315.

Villages
The 3 villages of the sub-prefecture of Aboudé and their population in 2014 are:
 Aboude-Kouassikro (11 439)
 Aboude-Mandéké (7 357)
 Kouadjokro (1 000)

References

Sub-prefectures of Agnéby-Tiassa
Former communes of Ivory Coast